A statue of Junípero Serra (sometimes called Father Junipero Serra or Fra Junipero Serra) was installed in a portion of El Pueblo de Los Ángeles Historical Monument informally known as Father Serra Park in Los Angeles, California.

Description
Located between the Santa Ana Freeway and the city's Chinatown district, the bronze sculpture of Junípero Serra, a replica of the one completed by Ettore Cadorin for the National Statuary Hall Collection in 1930, measures approximately 8' 9" × 2' 2" × 2' 4", and rests on a concrete base that measures approximately 5' 8" × 3' 8" × 3' 8".

History
The memorial was installed in 1932. Some 4,000 people came for the occasion.

The artwork was surveyed by the Smithsonian Institution's "Save Outdoor Sculpture!" program in 1994.

Removal
The statue was toppled by a group consisting of members from the Tongva and Tataviam Tribal Nations and Native/Indigenous activists in solidarity with the George Floyd protests in June 2020.

The City of Los Angeles deemed the removal an act of civil disobedience. On June 30, 2020, the city introduced a motion to address controversial statues, plaques and other symbolic honorifics. The park will be renamed by the Board of Recreation and Parks Commissioners in collaboration with local tribal communities.

See also

 Statue of Junípero Serra (disambiguation)

References

External links
 
 

1932 establishments in California
1932 sculptures
Bronze sculptures in California
Monuments and memorials in California
Monuments and memorials removed during the George Floyd protests
Outdoor sculptures in Greater Los Angeles
Sculptures of men in California
Statues in California
Los Angeles
Statues removed in 2020
Vandalized works of art in California